Boulder Dash Construction Kit is the fourth game in the Boulder Dash series. It was first published for the Commodore 64 by Epyx in 1986. Ports were later released for the Atari 8-bit family, Apple II, ZX Spectrum, and Atari ST The Spectrum version was rereleased as Boulder Dash IV: The Game. Boulder Dash Construction Kit adds levels and a level editor.

Reception
Rick Teverbaugh reviewed the Atari ST version of the game for Antic and said "I'd mostly recommend it for Boulder Dash fanatics who know the game inside and out and want new horizons and challenges. They certainly can be created here."

Steve Panak reviewed the Atari 8-bit version of the game for Antic and said "Of course, one expects all the hallmarks of a proven arcade wristbuster. The simple objectives, fast action and superb graphics make for hours of addictive play."

Rhett Anderson for Compute! said "Players unfamiliar with Boulderdash probably won't stand much of a chance; experts will be delighted. Beginners are better off designing their own games with easier challenges before trying to tackle the sample game."

David Langendoen for Family Computing said "Make sure you take a look at it. It's even a "boulder" and better game than its predecessors."

Ervin Bobo for Compute!'s Gazette said "The action here is fast and deadly."

Reviews
Zzap! - Dec, 1986
Computer and Video Games - Apr, 1990
Commodore Format - Feb, 1994
Your Sinclair - Feb, 1988
Atari User - Aug, 1987
ASM (Aktueller Software Markt) - Jan, 1987
ASM (Aktueller Software Markt) - Dec, 1989
Happy Computer (1987-01)

References

External links
Review in Info

1986 video games
Amiga games
Amstrad CPC games
Apple II games
Atari 8-bit family games
Atari ST games
Commodore 64 games
DOS games
Epyx games
First Star Software games
Rocks-and-diamonds games
Video game level editors
Video games developed in the United States
ZX Spectrum games